The medial inguinal fossa is a depression located within the inguinal triangle on the peritoneal surface of the anterior abdominal wall between the ridges formed by the lateral umbilical fold and the medial umbilical ligament, corresponding to the superficial inguinal ring.

Clinical significance
It is associated with direct inguinal hernias.

See also
 Lateral inguinal fossa

Abdomen